Jean-Pierre Grivois is a French writer and music scholar. He was born in Mortagne, Orne. He is a retired businessman and amateur organist; he also researched the life and music of Johann Sebastian Bach for more than fifteen years, which resulted in two acclaimed books, Moi, JSB and Entre es notes de Bach.

References

French male writers
Year of birth missing (living people)
Living people
People from Mortagne-au-Perche